Nansan may refer to the following locations in China:

 Nansan, Guangdong (南三镇), town in Potou District, Zhanjiang, Guangdong
 Nansan, Yunnan (南伞镇), town in Zhenkang County, Lincang, Yunnan